Calvin Graves (January 3, 1804 – February 11, 1877) was an American politician. He was a house member of the North Carolina General Assembly and a member of the North Carolina State Senate. He was the son of Azariah Graves.

Graves studied at the Bingham School, University of North Carolina, and with Leonard Henderson, before establishing a law practice in Yanceyville and entering politics as a delegate from Caswell County to the 1835 state constitutional convention.

He supported railway expansion and the North Carolina Railroad, supported the establishment of an insane asylum, and was a trustee at Wake Forest University. He opposed voting rights for African Americans. His vote for a railroad as Senate president broke a tie.

He and his wife had two sons and two daughters. A historical marker is at the site of his birthplace.

References

1804 births
1877 deaths
Members of the North Carolina House of Representatives
North Carolina state senators
People from Yanceyville, North Carolina
19th-century American politicians